Apomorphine, sold under the brand name Apokyn among others, is a type of aporphine having activity as a non-selective dopamine agonist which activates both D2-like and, to a much lesser extent, D1-like receptors. It also acts as an antagonist of 5-HT2 and α-adrenergic receptors with high affinity. The compound is historically a morphine decomposition product made by boiling morphine with concentrated acid, hence the -morphine suffix. Contrary to its name, apomorphine does not actually contain morphine or its skeleton, nor does it bind to opioid receptors. The apo- prefix relates to it being a morphine derivative ("[comes] from morphine").

Historically, apomorphine has been tried for a variety of uses, including as a way to relieve anxiety and craving in alcoholics, an emetic (to induce vomiting), for treating stereotypies (repeated behaviour) in farmyard animals, and more recently in treating erectile dysfunction. Currently, apomorphine is used in the treatment of Parkinson's disease. It is a potent emetic and should not be administered without an antiemetic such as domperidone. The emetic properties of apomorphine are exploited in veterinary medicine to induce therapeutic emesis in canines that have recently ingested toxic or foreign substances.

Apomorphine was also used as a private treatment of heroin addiction, a purpose for which it was championed by the author William S. Burroughs. Burroughs and others claimed that it was a "metabolic regulator" with a restorative dimension to a damaged or dysfunctional dopaminergic system. Despite anecdotal evidence that this offers a plausible route to an abstinence-based mode, no clinical trials have ever tested this hypothesis. A recent study indicates that apomorphine might be a suitable marker for assessing central dopamine system alterations associated with chronic heroin consumption. There is, however, no clinical evidence that apomorphine is an effective and safe treatment regimen for opiate addiction.

Medical uses 
Apomorphine is used in advanced Parkinson's disease intermittent hypomobility ("off" episodes), where a decreased response to an anti-Parkinson drug such as L-DOPA causes muscle stiffness and loss of muscle control. While apomorphine can be used in combination with L-DOPA, the intention is usually to reduce the L-DOPA dosing, as by this stage the patient often has many of dyskinesias caused by L-DOPA and hypermobility periods. When an episode sets in, the apomorphine is injected subcutaneously or applied sublingually, and signs subside. It is used an average of three times a day. Some people use portable mini-pumps that continuously infuse them with apomorphine, allowing them to stay in the "on" state and using apomorphine as an effective monotherapy.

Contraindications 
The main and absolute contraindication to using apomorphine is the concurrent use of adrenergic receptor antagonists; combined, they cause a severe drop in blood pressure and fainting. Alcohol causes an increased frequency of orthostatic hypotension (a sudden drop in blood pressure when getting up), and can also increase the chances of pneumonia and heart attacks. Dopamine antagonists, by their nature of competing for sites at dopamine receptors, reduce the effectiveness of the agonistic apomorphine.

IV administration of apomorphine is highly discouraged, as it can crystallize in the veins and create a blood clot (thrombus) and block a pulmonary artery (pulmonary embolism).

Side effects 
Nausea and vomiting are common side effects when first beginning therapy with apomorphine; antiemetics such as trimethobenzamide or domperidone, dopamine antagonists, are often used while first starting apomorphine. Around 50% of people grow tolerant enough to apomorphine's emetic effects that they can discontinue the antiemetic.

Other side effects include orthostatic hypotension and resultant fainting, sleepiness, dizziness, runny nose, sweating, paleness, and flushing. More serious side effects include dyskinesias (especially when taking L-DOPA), fluid accumulation in the limbs (edema), suddenly falling asleep, confusion and hallucinations, increased heart rate and heart palpitations, and persistent erections (priapism). The priapism is caused by apomorphine increasing arterial blood supply to the penis. This side effect has been exploited in studies attempting to treat erectile dysfunction.

Pharmacology

Mechanism of action 
Apomorphine's R-enantiomer is an agonist of both D1 and D2 dopamine receptors, with higher activity at D2. The members of the D2 subfamily, consisting of D2, D3, and D4 receptors, are inhibitory G protein–coupled receptors. The D4 receptor in particular is an important target in the signaling pathway, and is connected to several neurological disorders. Shortage or excess of dopamine can prevent proper function and signaling of these receptors leading to disease states.

Apomorphine improves motor function by activating dopamine receptors in the nigrostriatal pathway, the limbic system, the hypothalamus, and the pituitary gland. It also increases blood flow to the supplementary motor area and to the dorsolateral prefrontal cortex (stimulation of which has been found to reduce the tardive dyskinesia effects of L-DOPA). Parkinson's has also been found to have excess iron at the sites of neurodegeneration; both the (R)- and (S)-enantiomers of apomorphine are potent iron chelators and radical scavengers.

Apomorphine also decreases the breakdown of dopamine in the brain (though it inhibits its synthesis as well). It is an upregulator of certain neural growth factors, in particular NGF but not BDNF, epigenetic downregulation of which has been associated with addictive behaviour in rats.

Apomorphine causes vomiting by acting on dopamine receptors in the chemoreceptor trigger zone of the medulla; this activates the nearby vomiting center.

Pharmacokinetics 
While apomorphine has lower bioavailability when taken orally, due to not being absorbed well in the GI tract and undergoing heavy first-pass metabolism, it has a bioavailability of 100% when given subcutaneously. It reaches peak plasma concentration in 10–60 minutes. Ten to twenty minutes after that, it reaches its peak concentration in the cerebrospinal fluid. Its lipophilic structure allows it to cross the blood–brain barrier.

Apomorphine possesses affinity for the following receptors (note that a higher Ki indicates a lower affinity):

It has a Ki of over 10,000 nM (and thus negligible affinity) for β-adrenergic, H1, and mACh.

Apomorphine has a high clearance rate (3–5 L/kg/hr) and is mainly metabolized and excreted by the liver. It is likely that while the cytochrome P450 system plays a minor role, most of apomorphine's metabolism happens via auto-oxidation, O-glucuronidation, O-methylation, N-demethylation, and sulfation. Only 3–4% of the apomorphine is excreted unchanged and into the urine. The half-life is 30–60 minutes, and the effects of the injection last for up to 90 minutes.

Toxicity depends on the route of administration; the LD50s in mice were 300 mg/kg for the oral route, 160 mg/kg for intraperitoneal, and 56 mg/kg intravenous.

Chemistry

Properties 
Apomorphine has a catechol structure similar to that of dopamine.

Synthesis 
Several techniques exist for the creation of apomorphine from morphine. In the past, morphine had been combined with hydrochloric acid at high temperatures (around 150 °C) to achieve a low yield of apomorphine, ranging anywhere from 0.6% to 46%.
More recent techniques create the apomorphine in a similar fashion, by heating it in the presence of any acid that will promote the essential dehydration rearrangement of morphine-type alkaloids, such as phosphoric acid. The method then deviates by including a water scavenger, which is essential to remove the water produced by the reaction that can react with the product and lead to decreased yield. The scavenger can be any reagent that will irreversibly react with water such as phthalic anhydride or titanium chloride. The temperature required for the reaction varies based upon choice of acid and water scavenger. The yield of this reaction is much higher: at least 55%.

History 
The pharmacological effects of the naturally-occurring analog aporphine in the blue lotus (Nymphaea caerulea) were known to the ancient Egyptians and Mayans, with the plant featuring in tomb frescoes and associated with entheogenic rites. It is also observed in Egyptian erotic cartoons, suggesting that they were aware of its erectogenic properties.

The modern medical history of apomorphine begins with its synthesis by Arppe in 1845 from morphine and sulfuric acid, although it was named sulphomorphide at first. Matthiesen and Wright (1869) used hydrochloric acid instead of sulfuric acid in the process, naming the resulting compound apomorphine. Initial interest in the compound was as an emetic, tested and confirmed safe by London doctor Samuel Gee, and for the treatment of stereotypies in farmyard animals. Key to the use of apomorphine as a behavioural modifier was the research of Erich Harnack, whose experiments in rabbits (which do not vomit) demonstrated that apomorphine had powerful effects on the activity of rabbits, inducing licking, gnawing and in very high doses convulsions and death.

Treatment of alcoholism 
Apomorphine was one of the earliest used pharmacotherapies for alcoholism. The Keeley Cure (1870s to 1900) contained apomorphine, among other ingredients, but the first medical reports of its use for more than pure emesis come from James Tompkins and Charles Douglas. Tompkins reported, after injection of 6.5 mg ("one tenth of a grain"):Douglas saw two purposes for apomorphine:This use of small, continuous doses (1/30th of a grain, or 2.16 mg by Douglas) of apomorphine to reduce alcoholic craving comes some time before Pavlov's discovery and publication of the idea of the "conditioned reflex" in 1903. This method was not limited to Douglas; the Irish doctor Francis Hare, who worked in a sanatorium outside London from 1905 onward, also used low-dose apomorphine as a treatment, describing it as "the most useful single drug in the therapeutics of inebriety". He wrote:He also noted there appeared to be a significant prejudice against the use of apomorphine, both from the associations of its name and doctors being reluctant to give hypodermic injections to alcoholics. In the US, the Harrison Narcotics Tax Act made working with any morphine derivatives extremely hard, despite apomorphine itself not being an opiate.

In the 1950s the neurotransmitter dopamine was discovered in the brain by Katharine Montagu, and characterised as a neurotransmitter a year later by Arvid Carlsson, for which he would be awarded the Nobel Prize. A. N. Ernst then discovered in 1965 that apomorphine was a powerful stimulant of dopamine receptors. This, along with the use of sublingual apomorphine tablets, led to a renewed interest in the use of apomorphine as a treatment for alcoholism. A series of studies of non-emetic apomorphine in the treatment of alcoholism were published, with mostly positive results. However, there was little clinical consequence.

Parkinson's disease 
The use of apomorphine to treat "the shakes" was first suggested by Weil in France in 1884, although seemingly not pursued until 1951. Its clinical use was first reported in 1970 by Cotzias et al., although its emetic properties and short half-life made oral use impractical. A later study found that combining the drug with the antiemetic domperidone improved results significantly. The commercialization of apomorphine for Parkinson's disease followed its successful use in patients with refractory motor fluctuations using intermittent rescue injections and continuous infusions.

Aversion therapy 
Aversion therapy in alcoholism had its roots in Russia in the early 1930s, with early papers by Pavlov, Galant and Sluchevsky and Friken, and would remain a strain in the Soviet treatment of alcoholism well into the 1980s. In the US a particularly notable devotee was Dr Voegtlin, who attempted aversion therapy using apomorphine in the mid to late 1930s. However, he found apomorphine less able to induce negative feelings in his subjects than the stronger and more unpleasant emetic emetine.

In the UK, however, the publication of J Y Dent's (who later went on to treat Burroughs) 1934 paper "Apomorphine in the treatment of Anxiety States" laid out the main method by which apomorphine would be used to treat alcoholism in Britain. His method in that paper is clearly influenced by the then-novel idea of aversion:However, even in 1934 he was suspicious of the idea that the treatment was pure conditioned reflex – "though vomiting is one of the ways that apomorphine relives the patient, I do not believe it to be its main therapeutic effect." – and by 1948 he wrote:This led to his development of lower-dose and non-aversive methods, which would inspire a positive trial of his method in Switzerland by Dr Harry Feldmann and later scientific testing in the 1970s, some time after his death. However, the use of apomorphine in aversion therapy had escaped alcoholism, with its use to treat homosexuality leading to the death of a British Army Captain Billy Clegg Hill in 1962,  helping to cement its reputation as a dangerous drug used primarily in archaic behavioural therapies.

Opioid addiction 
In his Deposition: Testimony Concerning a Sickness in the introduction to later editions of Naked Lunch (first published in 1959), William S. Burroughs wrote that apomorphine treatment was the only effective cure to opioid addiction he has encountered:

He goes on to lament the fact that as of his writing, little to no research has been done on apomorphine or variations of the drug to study its effects on curing addiction, and perhaps the possibility of retaining the positive effects while removing the side effect of vomiting.

Despite his claims throughout his life, Burroughs never really cured his addiction and was back to using opiates within years of his apomorphine "cure". However, he insisted on apomorphine's effectiveness in several works and interviews.

Society and culture
 Apomorphine has a vital part in Agatha Christie's detective story Sad Cypress.
 The 1965 Tuli Kupferberg song "Hallucination Horrors" recommends apomorphine at the end of each verse as a cure for hallucinations brought on by a humorous variety of intoxicants; the song was recorded by The Fugs and appears on the album Virgin Fugs.

Research 

There is renewed interest in the use of apomorphine to treat addiction, in both smoking cessation and alcoholism. As the drug is known to be reasonably safe for use in humans, it is a viable target for repurposing.

Apomorphine has been researched as a possible treatment for erectile dysfunction and female hypoactive sexual desire disorder, though its efficacy has been limited. Nonetheless, it  was under development as a treatment for erectile dysfunction by TAP Pharmaceuticals under the brand name Uprima. In 2000, TAP withdrew its new drug application after an FDA review panel raised questions about the drug's safety, due to many clinical trial subjects fainting after taking the drug.

Alzheimer's disease 
Apomorphine is reported to be an inhibitor of amyloid beta protein fiber formation, whose presence is a hallmark of Alzheimer's disease, and a potential therapeutic under the amyloid hypothesis.

Alternative administration routes 

Two routes of administration are currently clinically utilized: subcutaneous (either as intermittent injections or continuous infusion) and sublingual. Other non-invasive administration routes were investigated as a substitute for parenteral administration, reaching different preclinical and clinical stages. These include: peroral, nasal, pulmonary, transdermal, rectal, and buccal, as well as iontophoresis methods.

Veterinary use 
Apomorphine is used to inducing vomiting in dogs after ingestion of various toxins or foreign bodies. It can be given subcutaneously, intramuscularly, intravenously, or, when a tablet is crushed, in the conjunctiva of the eye. The oral route is ineffective, as apomorphine cannot cross the blood–brain barrier fast enough, and blood levels don't reach a high enough concentration to stimulate the chemoreceptor trigger zone. It can remove around 40–60% of the contents in the stomach.

One of the reasons apomorphine is a preferred drug is its reversibility: in cases of prolonged vomiting, the apomorphine can be reversed with dopamine antagonists like the phenothiazines (for example, acepromazine). Giving apomorphine after giving acepromazine, however, will no longer stimulate vomiting, because apomorphine's target receptors are already occupied. An animal who undergoes severe respiratory depression due to apomorphine can be treated with naloxone.

Apomorphine does not work in cats, who have too few dopamine receptors.

See also 
 Apomorphine (data page)
 Propylnorapomorphine

References

External links 
 

5-HT2A antagonists
5-HT2B antagonists
5-HT2C antagonists
Alpha blockers
Catechols
Dibenzoquinolines
D1-receptor agonists
D2-receptor agonists
D3 receptor agonists
D4 receptor agonists
D5 receptor agonists
Erectile dysfunction drugs
Sexual orientation and medicine